Hamzehabad (also Romanized as Ḩamzehābād) is a village in Kermajan Rural District, in the Central District of Kangavar County, Kermanshah Province, Iran. At the 2006 census, its population was 138, in 36 families.

References 

Populated places in Kangavar County